Idea Cellula Limited (commonly referred to as Idea, and stylised as !dea) was an Indian mobile network operator based at Mumbai, Maharashtra. Idea was a pan-India integrated GSM operator and had 220.00 million subscribers as of June 2018. Idea Cellular merged with Vodafone India and is now known as Vodafone Idea or Vi.

History
Idea Cellular was incorporated as Birla Communications Limited in 1995 after GSM licenses were won in Gujarat and Maharashtra circles. The company name was changed to Idea Cellular and the brand Idea was introduced in 2002 after a series of name changes following mergers and joint ventures with Grasim Industries, AT&T Corporation and Tata Group. Following the exit of AT&T Corporation and Tata Group from the joint venture in 2004 and 2006 respectively, Idea Cellular became a subsidiary of Aditya Birla Group. Malaysia based Axiata had bought around 20% stake in the company in 2008 for US$2 billion.

Idea previously bought a 40.8% stake in Spice Communications Ltd, operating as Spice Telecom, for over 2,700 crore.

Merger of Vodafone and Idea (Vi)

The entry of Jio in 2016 had led to various mergers and consolidations in the Indian telecom sector. It was announced in March 2017 that even Idea Cellular and Vodafone India would be merged. The merger got approval from Department Of Telecommunications in July 2018. On August 30, 2018, National Company Law Tribunal gave the final nod to the Vodafone-Idea merger   The merger was completed on 31 August 2018, and the newly merged entity was named Vodafone Idea Limited. The merger created the largest telecom company in India by subscribers and by revenue. Under the terms of the deal, the Vodafone Group holds a 45.2% stake in the combined entity, the Aditya Birla Group holds 26% and the remaining shares will be held by the public.

After merge, Vodafone and Idea became known as Vi. It was a biggest combination between two telecom companies in the world.

On 7 September 2020, Vodafone Idea unveiled this new brand identity, Vi, which involved the integration of the company's erstwhile separate brands Vodafone and Idea into one unified brand.

Operations 

In the 2010 3G spectrum auction, Idea paid  for spectrum in 11 circles. After the launch of MNP in India, Idea further strengthened its customer base because it was the mobile network with most net port-ins.

Radio frequency summary

Idea Cellular owned spectrum in 900 MHz, 1800 MHz, 2100 MHz, 2300 MHz and 2500 MHz bands across the country.

Note: The above table contains Vodafone-Idea (merged entity) radio frequency details because they used to share their networks with each other via ICR (intra-circle roaming agreement) in some circles. For example, Idea had started giving its customers in Delhi access to 4G services in May 2018 via the Vodafone network.

References

Further reading 

 Liquidity and Profitability Tradeoff (a study of Idea Cellular Limited)

External links
 

Companies based in Mumbai
Telecommunications companies of India
Axiata
Aditya Birla Group
Mobile phone companies of India
Private equity portfolio companies
Providence Equity Partners companies
Internet service providers of India
Indian companies established in 1995
Indian brands
Former AT&T subsidiaries
Former Tata Group subsidiaries
1995 establishments in Maharashtra
Telecommunications companies established in 1995
Companies listed on the National Stock Exchange of India
Companies listed on the Bombay Stock Exchange